Mathilde Casadesus (1921–1965) was a French film actress.

Partial filmography

 Box of Dreams (1945) - L'Agitée
 La part de l'ombre (1945)
 The Idiot (1946) - Adélaïde Epantchine
 The Murdered Model (1948) - Madame Malaise
 Tous les deux (1949) - La cliente
 Marlene (1949) - Betty
 Au royaume des cieux (1949) - Madame Barattier la Patronne de l'Auberge
 Branquignol (1949) - Suzanne
 Le Roi Pandore (1950) - Marika
 The Sleepwalker (1951) - Mademoiselle Thomas
 Le Plaisir (1952) - Madame Louise dite Cocotte (segment "La Maison Tellier")
 The Lady of the Camellias (1953) - Prudence
 The Air of Paris (1954) - Voyageuse
 Ce soir les jupons volent... (1956) - Madame Pommeau
 Gervaise (1956) - Mme Boche - la concierge curieuse
 Burning Fuse (1957) - Mimi
 Me and the Colonel (1958) - Secretary (uncredited)
 Love Is My Profession (1958) - Anna - la patronne du restaurant (uncredited)
 Life Together (1958) - La cuisinière d'Odette
 Le petit prof (1959) - Mme. Boulard
 The Bureaucrats (1959) - Madame Nègre
 Certains l'aiment froide (1960) - Mathilde Rouet, née Valmorin
 Meurtre en 45 tours (1960) - Elsa
 Candide ou l'optimisme au XXe siècle (1960) - La baronne de Thunder-Ten-Tronck
 À rebrousse-poil (1961) - Mme. Durand
 Les amours de Paris (1961) - L'infirmière-major
 Conduite à gauche (1962) - La cliente
 The Law of Men (1962) - Madame Thiebaut6
 Le couteau dans la plaie (1962) - Mme. Duval, Concierge
 Moonlight in Maubeuge (1962) - La dame aux courses
 The Reluctant Spy (1963) - Maria Linas - la diva
 Les mordus de Paris (1965)
 Les combinards (1966) - La bouchère de Cussac

References

Bibliography
 Goble, Alan. The Complete Index to Literary Sources in Film. Walter de Gruyter, 1999.

External links

1921 births
1965 deaths
French film actresses
French television actresses
Actresses from Paris
20th-century French women
French expatriates in Spain